Hanza District is a district (bakhsh) in Rabor County, Kerman Province, Iran. At the 2006 census, its population was 11.261, in 2,541 families.  The district has one city Hanza. The district has two rural districts (dehestan): Hanza Rural District and Javaran Rural District.

References 

Rabor County
Districts of Kerman Province